The 2000 is a B-boying move which resembles a rapidly spinning handstand. It is a type of spin in practice, but many consider it a power move because it is so flashy and is often begun with significant momentum like other power moves. As one might guess from the name, the 2000 developed soon after the 1990, and it is the most recognized variant of its predecessor. The difference between the two is that in the 2000, the non-spinning hand is lifted and placed directly on top of the spinning hand rather than pulled away from the ground (as in the 1990). The rotations appear more symmetrical than 1990s.

It is relatively easier in terms of strength than the 1990 because two hands are stronger than one, but it is equally difficult to maintain balance because the body should spin along a perfectly vertical axis. The fastest spins are achieved by beginning with the legs in a wide-open initial position and snapping them closed once the spin begins. This causes a dramatic reduction in rotational inertia, causing rapid angular acceleration (due to the conservation of angular momentum).

Breakdance moves
Articles containing video clips